The Communist Party of Canada - Manitoba fielded five candidates in the 2003 provincial election, none of whom were elected.  Information about these candidates may be found on this page.  The party received a total of 334 votes.

Lisa Gallagher (Brandon East)

Gallagher received 58 votes (0.93%), finishing fourth against New Democratic Party incumbent Drew Caldwell.

Cheryl-Anne Carr (Minto)

Carr is a Métis woman.  She has worked as a community development worker for Central Child and Family Services, and is a graduate of Red River's Intercultural Trainers program.  She is a member of the Winnipeg peace movement, and opposed the 2003 Invasion of Iraq.  She supported a proposed blockade of rail services in 2007, to draw attention to poverty and self-determination issues affecting aboriginal communities.

Carrwas listed as chair of the Communist Party's Aboriginal People's Commission in 2005, and was a Central Committee alternate.  She has sought provincial office twice, and her daughter Anna-Celestrya Carr has been a candidate of the Communist Party of Canada.

Aaron Crossman (Pembina)

Crossman received 81 votes (1.32%), finishing fourth against Progressive Conservative incumbent Peter George Dyck.

Darrell Rankin (Point Douglas)

Rankin has led the Manitoba Communist Party since 1996.  He received 82 votes (2.13%), finishing fourth against New Democratic Party incumbent George Hickes.

Glen Wreggitt (Wellington)

Wreggitt was listed as the chief financial officer for the Manitoba Communist Party in 2001.  He is active in the Winnipeg peace movement.  He received 45 votes (1.07%), finishing fourth against New Democratic Party incumbent Conrad Santos.

Footnotes

2003